Bankura Sadar subdivision is a subdivision of the Bankura district in the state of West Bengal, India.

Subdivisions
Bankura district is divided into the following administrative subdivisions:

Bankura Sadar subdivision has a density of population of 554 per km2. 40.1% of the population of the district resides in this subdivision.

Administrative units
Bankura Sadar subdivision has 9 police stations, 8 community development blocks, 8 panchayat samitis, 75 gram panchayats, 1,384 inhabited villages, 1 municipality and 4 census towns. Bankura is the only municipality in this subdivision. The census towns are: Jhanti Pahari, Barjora, Bhutgerya and Beliatore. The subdivision has its headquarters at Bankura.

Police stations
Police stations in Bankura Sadar subdivision have the following features and jurisdiction:

Blocks
Community development blocks in Bankura Sadar subdivision are:

Gram Panchayats
The subdivision contains 75 gram panchayats under eight community development blocks:

Bankura I block consists of six gram panchayats: Anchuri, Jagadalla–I, Kalapathar, Andharthole, Jagadalla–II and Kenjakura.   
Bankura II block consists of seven gram panchayats: Bikna, Kosthia, Narrah, Sanbandha, Janbedia, Mankanali and Purandarpur.
Barjora block consists of 11 gram panchayats: Barjora, Chhandar, Hatasuria, Pokhonna, Beliator, Ghutgoria, Khanrari, Shaharjora, Brindabanpur, Godardihi and Maliyara.  
Chhatna block consists of: Arrah, Dhaban, Jirrah, Teghari, Cheenabari, Ghoshergram, Metyala, Chhatna–I, Jamtora, Shaldiha, Chhatna–II, Jhunjhka and Shushunia.
Gangajalghati block consists of: Banasuria, Gangajalghati, Lachhmanpur, Piraboni, Barashal, Gobindadham, Latiaboni, Bhaktabandh, Kapista and Nityanandapur.
Mejia block consists of: Ardhagram, Kushtor, Ramchandrapur, Banjora and Mejia.
Onda block consists of: Chingani, Lodna, Nikunjapur, Ramsagar, Churamonipur, Majdiha, Onda–I, Ratanpur, Kalyani, Medinipur, Onda–II, Santor, Kantabari, Nakaijuri and Punisole.
Saltora block consists of: Bamuntor, Gogra, Pabra, Saltora, Dhekia, Kanuri, Salma and Tiluri.

Education
Bankura district had a literacy rate of 70.26%  as per the provisional figures of the census of India 2011. Bankura Sadar subdivision had a literacy rate of 69.56%, Khatra subdivision 69.79% and Bishnupur subdivision 71.60%.  

Given in the table below (data in numbers) is a comprehensive picture of the education scenario in Bankura district for the year 2013–14. It may be noted that primary schools include junior basic schools; middle schools, high schools and higher secondary schools include madrasahs; technical schools include junior technical schools, junior government polytechnics, industrial technical institutes, industrial training centres, nursing training institutes etc.; technical and professional colleges include engineering colleges, medical colleges, para-medical institutes, management colleges, teachers training and nursing training colleges, law colleges, art colleges, music colleges etc. Special and non-formal education centres include sishu siksha kendras, madhyamik siksha kendras, centres of Rabindra mukta vidyalaya, recognised Sanskrit tols, institutions for the blind and other handicapped persons, Anganwadi centres, reformatory schools etc.

Educational institutions
The following institutions are located in Bankura Sadar subdivision:
Bankura University was established in 2013.
Bankura Sammilani Medical College at Bankura was started as a medical school in 1922 and was upgraded to a medical college in 1954. The Government of West Bengal took over the institution in 1961. The 131 bedded Bankura district hospital was merged with it in 1964.
Bankura Unnayani Institute of Engineering at Puabagan, Bankura was established in 1998.  It is affiliated to Maulana Abul Kalam Azad University of Technology. It conducts BTech. and MTech courses.
 Bankura Christian College at Bankura was established in 1903 by Weslayan Missionary Society.
Bankura Sammilani College at Bankura was established in 1948.
Bankura Zilla Saradamani Mahila Mahavidyapith at Bankura is a women's college established in 1973.
Saldiha College at Saldiha was established in 1966. It has hostel facilities – three for boys and one for girls.
Gobindaprasad Mahavidyalaya was established in 1985 at Amarkanan.
Barjora College at Barjora was established in 1985.
Jamini Roy College was established at Beliatore in 1986.
Saltora Netaji Centenary College at Saltora was established in 2001.
Chhatna Chandidas Mahavidyalaya was established at Ghoramuli, Chhatna in 2007.
Onda Thana Mahavidyalaya was established at PO Murakata in 2007.
Government General Degree College, Mejia at Gopalpur village, PO Mejia, was established in 2015.
The College of Agriculture, at Chhatna, an extended campus of Bidhan Chandra Krishi Vishwavidyalaya was started in 2015.

Healthcare
The table below (all data in numbers) presents an overview of the medical facilities available and patients treated in the hospitals, health centres and sub-centres in 2014 in Bankura district.

Medical facilities
Medical facilities in Bankura Sadar subdivision are as follows:

Hospitals: (Name, location, beds) 

Bankura Sammilani Medical College and Hospital, Bankura M, 947 beds
District Correctional Home Hospital, Bankura M, 8 beds
Bankura Police Hospital, Bankura M, 20 beds
Gouripur Leprosy Hospital, Gouripur, 550 beds
RLTRRI, Gouripur, 50 beds

Rural Hospitals: (Name, CD block, location, beds) 

Gangajalghati (Amar Kanan) Rural Hospital, Gangjalghati CD block, PO Amarkanan, 30 beds
Anchuri Rural Hospital, Bankura I CD block, Achuri, 30 beds
Chhatna Rural Hospital, Chhatna CD block, Chhatna, 30 beds
Saltora Rural Hospital, Saltora CD block, Saltora, 30 beds
Barjora Rural Hospital, Barjora CD block, Barjora, 30 beds
Onda Rural Hospital, Onda CD block, PO Medinipurgram, 30 beds

Block Primary Health Centres: (Name, CD block, location, beds)

Kanchanpur Block Primary Health Centre, Bankura II CD Block, Kanchanpur, 15 beds
Mejia Block Primary Health Centre, Mejia CD block, Mejia, 25 beds

Primary Health Centres : (CD block-wise)(CD block, PHC location, beds)

Bankura I CD block: Helna Susunia (10), Kanjakura (10)
Bankura II CD block: Narrah (4), Mankanali (10)
Chhatna CD block: Jorhia (10), Salchura (Kamalpur) (2), Jhantipahari (6), Bhagabanpur (6)
Saltora CD block: Gogra (10), Ituri (Tiluri) (10), Kashtora (6)
Gangajalghati CD block: Gangajalghati (4), Ramharipur (4), Srichandrapur (10)
Mejhia CD block: Ramchandrapur (4), Pairasol (10)
Barjora CD block: Beliatore (10), Chhandar (4), Godardihi (Jagannathpur) (4), Pakhanna (10)
Onda CD block: Ratanpur (10), Nakaijuri (Ghorasol) (10), Ramsagar (10), Santore (Garh Kotalpur) (10), Nikunjapur (10)

Electoral constituencies
Lok Sabha (parliamentary) and Vidhan Sabha (state assembly) constituencies in Bankura district were as follows:

References

Subdivisions of West Bengal
Subdivisions in Bankura district
Bankura district